Pierre Boutang (20 September 1916 – 27 June 1998) was a French philosopher, poet and translator. He was also a political journalist, associated with the currents of Maurrasianism and Royalism.

Biography
Boutang was an alumnus of the Ecole Normale Supérieure (L 1935) and "agrégé de philosophie" in 1936, he participated that year in editing Action Française and showed fervent support for the ideas of Charles Maurras. He was a member of Giraud's government in North Africa in 1943, and enlisted in the French colonial army, serving in Tunisia and Morocco. He was discharged without pension and prohibited from teaching. Thereafter he took up journalism, collaborating on Aspects de la France, where his articles from a royalist viewpoint showed obvious antisemitism. He was a regular contributor to Bulletin de Paris, where using a pseudonym, he reviewed plays.

Seeking to renew royalism, in alignment with Christianity, with his friend Michel Vivier he founded the weekly La Nation Française in 1955, to which Les Hussards and also Marcel Aymé, Gustave Thibon, and Armand Robin contributed. He wanted to create "a Sartre shelter" that also functioned against the adherents of nihilism. He veered between supporting Charles de Gaulle and opposing him, insisting notably on the monarchical model on which, in his view, the constitution of the Cinquième République rested. Though he denounced the "terror" for which the FLN (Front de Libération Nationale Algérien) was responsible, Boutang refused to support the OAS. From the 1970s, his political declarations became rarer, but he showed a firm loyalty to the Comte de Paris.
 
After representations by Edmond Michelet, Alain Peyrefitte and others, Boutang was allowed to teach by President de Gaulle in 1967. He taught philosophy at the Lycée Turgot, and then became a lecturer at the University of Brest in 1974. Finally he was appointed Professeur of Metaphysics at the Sorbonne, where he taught until 1984, continuing his seminars at his home in Saint-Germain-en-Laye until the end of his life. He died on 27 June 1998.

Works

Non-fiction
 Amis du Maréchal (with Henri Dubreuil, 1941).
 Sartre est-il un Possédé? (1946).
 La Politique: la Politique Considérée comme Souci (1948).
 La République de Joinovici (1949).
 Les Abeilles de Delphes (1952).
 Commentaire sur Quarante-neuf Dizains de la 'Délie (1953).
 La Terreur en Question (1958).
 L'Ontologie du Secret (1973).
 Reprendre le Pouvoir (1977).
 Gabriel Marcel Interrogé (1977).
 Apocalypse du Désir (1979).
 La Fontaine Politique (1981).
 Précis de Foutriquet. Contre Giscard (1981).
 Maurras, la Destinée et l'Œuvre (1984).
 Art Poétique (1988).
 Karin Pozzi ou la Quête de l'Immortalité (1991).
 Le Temps. Essai sur l'Origine (1993).
 Dialogues. Sur le Mythe d'Antigone. Sur le Sacrifice d'Abraham (with George Steiner, 1994).
 La Fontaine. Les "Fables" ou la Langue des Dieux (1995).
 William Blake Manichéen et Visionnaire (1990).Posthumous La Source Sacrée (Les Abeilles de Delphes II, 2003).
 Dialogue sur le Mal (with George Steiner, 2003).
 La Guerre de Six Jours (2011).Fiction La Maison un Dimanche. Suivi de Chez Madame Dorlinde (1947).
 Quand le Furet s'Endort (1948).
 Le Secret de René Dorlinde (1958).
 Le Purgatoire (1976).Translations'''
 Apologie de Socrate, by Plato (1946).
 Le Banquet, by Plato (1972).
 L'Auberge Volante, by G. K. Chesterton (1990).
 Chansons et Mythes,'' by William Blake (1989).

References

External links
 Pierre Boutang: Action Française

Christian existentialists
1916 births
1998 deaths
Writers from Saint-Étienne
French monarchists
People affiliated with Action Française
French Roman Catholics
French traditionalist Catholics
20th-century French translators
20th-century French poets
French male poets
20th-century male writers
20th-century French journalists
20th-century French philosophers
Free French military personnel of World War II
20th-century French male writers